Raul Morales, sometimes known as just "Rawl", has been one of San Pedro's most prolific drummers from the 1990s to present. He is currently the drummer for Killer Dreamer as well as Mike Watt of the Minutemen fame's current projects.

Bands and Line ups
The Secondmen: Mike Watt, Pete Mazich (or Paul Roessler), Raul Morales
The Missingmen: Mike Watt, Tom Watson, Raul Morales
Killer Dreamer: Kid Kevin, Tony, Jacob, Rawl
F.Y.P: Todd C., Sean, Rawl
Jag Offs: Jacob, Tony, Monica, Rawl
The Leeches: Brian, Tony, Rawl
Bunk: Dan, Pete, Rawl
Drinkers Purgatory Troy, Sean, Mike, Rawl
Able Cross Adrian, Lalo, Raul

Record labels who have released material featuring Raul Morales:
Recess Records
Geykido Comet Records
Kapow Records

References

American punk rock drummers
American male drummers
American drummers
Living people
Year of birth missing (living people)